Jeffrey Hayden (October 15, 1926 – December 24, 2016) was an American television director and producer. He was married to actress Eva Marie Saint from 1951 until his death in 2016.

Television career
Born in New York City, Hayden's career as a director began in the late 1950s, when he directed the only feature film to his credit, The Vintage (1957), starring Pier Angeli and Mel Ferrer. He then turned to television, beginning with episodes of Leave It to Beaver and 77 Sunset Strip.

Hayden directed episodes of dozens of TV series from the 1960s into the 1990s, including such popular programs as The Andy Griffith Show, Burke's Law, Batman, Knight Rider, Magnum, P.I., and In the Heat of the Night.

Personal life and death
On October 28, 1951, Hayden married screen actress Eva Marie Saint. The couple had two children, Darrell and Laurette, and four grandchildren.

Shortly before their 50th anniversary, on October 13, 2001, the couple appeared together in a one-night-only performance of the play Love Letters at Bowling Green State University, Saint's alma mater.

Hayden died from cancer in Los Angeles, on December 24, 2016, at the age of 90.

Selected filmography

In the Heat of the Night
Misfits of Science
Knight Rider
Cover Up
Santa Barbara (Co-executive producer)
Legmen
The Mississippi
Emerald Point N.A.S.
The Powers of Matthew Star
Magnum, P.I.
Mr. Merlin
Falcon Crest
Quincy M.E.
CBS Afternoon Playhouse: "The Great Gilly Hopkins"
Palmerstown, U.S.A.
From Here to Eternity
The Incredible Hulk
The Bad News Bears
The Curse of Dracula
The Runaways
Space Academy
ABC Weekend Special: "The Ransom of Red Chief"
Amy Prentiss
Mannix
Alias Smith and Jones
Ironside
Longstreet
The Virginian
Matt Lincoln
The Courtship of Eddie's Father
Love, American Style
Dundee and the Culhane
Batman
Shane
That Girl
Disneyland
Peyton Place
The Andy Griffith Show
Route 66
Burke's Law
Redigo
McKeever and the Colonel
77 Sunset Strip
Saints and Sinners
The Dick Powell Show
The Lloyd Bridges Show
Surfside 6
Leave It to Beaver
The Donna Reed Show
Lassie
Johnny Staccato
The Vintage 
The Chocolate Soldier

References

External links

 

1926 births
2016 deaths
American television directors
Deaths from cancer in California
Soap opera producers
Television producers from New York City